The International Colloquium on Group Theoretical Methods in Physics is an academic conference devoted to applications of group theory to physics. It was founded in 1972 by Henri Bacry and Aloysio Janner. It hosts a colloquium every two years. The ICGTMP is led by a standing committee, which helps select winners for the two major awards presented at the conference: the Wigner Medal and the Weyl Prize.

Wigner Medal
The Wigner Medal is an award designed "to recognize outstanding contributions to the understanding of physics through Group Theory". The Wigner Medal is administered by The Group Theory and Fundamental Physics Foundation, a publicly supported organization. Donations are tax-deductible as provided pursuant to the provisions of Section 170 of the Internal Revenue Code, a federal code of the United States.

The award was first presented in 1978 to Eugene Wigner, and was first awarded at the Integrative Conference on Group Theory and Mathematical Physics.

List of conferences

See also

 List of physics awards
 List of prizes named after people

References

External links 
 ICGTMP Homepage
 Wigner Medal Homepage

Wigner
American science and technology awards
Awards established in 1978
Awards disestablished in 2018
Physics conferences
Mathematics conferences